is a 700-seat multi-purpose hall located in Sapporo, Japan. It opened in 1979 and has hosted artists such as Paul Rodgers, Tamio Okuda and Aimer.

References

External links
 Official website 

Music venues in Japan
Buildings and structures in Sapporo
Music venues completed in 1979
1979 establishments in Japan